Colotis doubledayi, the Doubleday's tip or Doubleday's orange, is a butterfly of the family Pieridae. It is found in the Afrotropical realm.

The wingspan is 32–40 mm in males and 34–45 mm in females. The adults have two broods from September to October and April to May.

The larvae feed on Maerua schinzii.

References

doubledayi
Butterflies described in 1862